Pond Cove is a small settlement in Newfoundland and Labrador, Canada. It is located south of Anchor Point.

See also
 List of communities in Newfoundland and Labrador

Populated places in Newfoundland and Labrador